Stefan Hippe (born 1966) is a German composer, conductor and accordionist.

Life 
Born in Nuremberg, Hippe received his first accordion lessons from Herbert Bausewein in 1974 and his first composition lessons from Hans-Ludwig Schilling in 1981. At the Hochschule für Musik Nürnberg he studied accordion with Willi Münch and Irene Kauper, then composition at the Hochschule für Musik Würzburg with Bertold Hummel and Heinz Winbeck and conducting with Günther Wich. Since 1999, he has taught at the Nuremberg Music School, and from 2004 to 2007 at the University of Erlangen–Nuremberg. With the soprano Irene Kurka he founded the duo Soprakkordeon in 2000.

Awards 

 1994: 1st prize at the composition competition of the Summer Music Academy Hitzacker (for the 2nd string quartet)
 1995: 1st prize at the composition competition of the city of Würzburg (for Kammermusik No.1)
 1997: Scholarship stay in the Cité internationale des arts Paris
 1998: 
 2000: Bavarian Promotion Prize for Young Artists
 2003: ; Fördergabe der  (Zürich)
 2006: Prize of the City of Cottbus (for Tumulus – nachts)

Compositions

Stage music 
 A Lady Dies (1999). Chamber opera. Libretto: . 11 March 2000 Nürnberg

Vocal compositions 
 23rd Psalm (1983) for voice and organ. Text Latin and German. 17 April 1988
 Die drei Teiche von Hellbrunn (1989). 1st string quartet, with soprano solo and double bass. Text: Georg Trakl. 19 June 1989, Lohr am Main
 Egonoia (1990) for chamber choir, contrabassoon and piano. Texts: 6 poems by Ernst Jandl. 20 June 1990, Würzburg
 Jusques à la mort... (1990). Song cycle for alto and piano. Text: Guillaume de Machaut, Rainer Maria Rilke and Friedrich Hölderlin. 17 December 1990, Würzburg
 Frühlingslied (1995) for mixed choir and accordion orchestra (4.4.4.2B). Text: from the Carmina Burana. 15 June 1996, Schweinfurt
 Wild with love (1997). Chamber music No.3 (1st movement) for voice, flute, percussion and accordion. Text: Stanley Kunitz. 21 November 2001, Nuremberg
 Credo (2000) for 8-part chamber choir and brass. 1 October 2000, Nuremberg
 Our Father (2001) for soprano, baritone, harp, glockenspiel and string sextet (1.1.2.2.0). 11 August 2001, Regensburg
 Wahnsinniges Gedicht (2001/02) for mixed choir and accordion orchestra. Text: 5 poems by Ernst Jandl. 6 May 2006, Nuremberg
 Under der linden (2002) for chamber choir. Text: 3 poems by Walther von der Vogelweide. 19 August 2002
 die liebe (2002) for soprano and accordion. Text: 2 poems by Gerhard Falkner. 14 January 2003, Nuremberg (Irene Kurka [soprano], Hippe [accordion])
 Blauer Himmel (2003) for soprano, flute, 2 guitars, violoncello and accordion. Text: 2 poems by Gerhard Falkner. 10 December 2003, Würzburg
 Requiem (2005) for soprano, mixed choir and orchestra. Text by Alejandra Pizarnik and from the Old Testament. 19 November 2005, Nuremberg (St. Lorenz)
 Stabat mater (2008) for 3-part mixed choir and accordion. 18 April 2009, Warsaw
 Atem 1946 (2019) for choir a cappella - Heinz Winbeck in Memoriam. 25 MaY 2019, Erlangen

Orchestra/ Ensemble work 
 The Temptation of St. Anthony (1986/97) for accordion orchestra (4.4.4.2B.2 Elektronium). 22 May 1998, Innsbruck
 Fresques (1989) for orchestra (2.2.2.2 - 4.2.3.0 - harp - percussion [2] - strings). 5 April 1991, Bad Reichenhall
 ...ein leiser Ton gezogen... (1990/91) for accordion orchestra (5.5.4.2B.2 Elektronien.Sw). 8 November 1991, Gaggenau
 Krakatao (1993) for accordion orchestra (4.4.3.2B.1-2 Elektronien.Sw). 23 November 1994, Weißenburg
 Kammermusik No.1 (1994) for ensemble (10 players: 1.0.1.0 - 1.1.1.0 - percussion - piano - strings: 1.0.0.1.1). 23 March 1995, Würzburg
 MŒHB (1996). Seven pieces for accordion orchestra (4.4.4.2B.2 Elektronien). 21 November 1998, Horsholm
 Salut (1997) for accordion orchestra (4.4.3.3.2B.2 Elektronien) and percussion. 24 June 1997, Stuttgart
 Portraits (1997) for symphony orchestra and accordion orchestra (4.4.4.4). 13 February 1988, (Hofer Symphoniker)
 OURCQ. Rêvie parisienne (1997) for accordion and accordion orchestra (4.4.4.2B.2 Elektronien). 21 November 1998, Nuremberg
 Ausdrucksorte (1998) for accordion orchestra (4.4.4.2B). 5 December 1998, Laaber
 Short Cuts' (2002/03) for accordion orchestra (4.4.3.3.2B), 2 electrons (ad libitum) and percussion (ad libitum). 19 July 2003, Nuremberg
 The Moons of Saturn
Part 1 (2005) for accordion orchestra (4.4.3.3.2 Elektronien.2B) and percussion. 8 April 2006, Trossingen
Part 2 (2006) for accordion orchestra (4.4.3.3.2 ;Elektronien.2B) and percussion. 18 March 2007, Erlangen
Part 3 (movements 10-14; 2008/09) for accordion orchestra (4.4.3.3.2B). Autumn 2009 Cottbus
 Tumulus - at night (2006) for accordion and string orchestra (6.5.4.3.2). 16 September 2006, Nuremberg (production: Rundfunk Berlin-Brandenburg)
 Tango capriccioso (2006) for accordion orchestra (4.4.3.3.2 Elektronien.2B), piano and percussion. 28 April 2007, Fürth
 Disposition (2006) for organ, 2 oboes, 2 horns in F and string quintet (solo or choral). 3 December 2006, Nuremberg (St. Jobst; for the inauguration of the organ).
 Trois Pièces' (2007) for youth symphony orchestra. 12 December 2007, Limoges
 Piano Concerto (2007/08)
Version for piano, accordion orchestra (with 2 electrons) and timpani. 22 March 2009, Frankfurt
Version for piano and symphony orchestra.

Film scores 
 for In der Hoffnung ist gut leben (Documentary by Helge Cramer) (1995), for accordion. First broadcast 28 August 1995 (Mitteldeutscher Rundfunk)
 for Fantômas (1913, director: Louis Feuillade) (2003/04), for 5 accordions, 2 electroniums and basso. 31 January 2004, Erlangen (Silent Film Music Days)
 for The White Hell of Pitz Palu (1929, director: Arnold Fanck, Georg Wilhelm Pabst) (2004), für Kammerensemble. 31 January 2005 Erlangen (Stummfilmmusiktage)

Chamber music

Soli 
 Capriccio (1981) for accordion. 1 April 1982 Nuremberg
 Epitaph fûr M (1987) for piano. 11 May 1988 Nuremberg
 Foot Fire Burn Dance (1997). Chamber music No.3 (2nd movement) for percussion. 11 February 2001, Lüneburg
 1000 Pieces (2001ff.) for piano  (first pieces). 5 May 2001 Munich
Work in progress; so far: No. 1, 22, 83, 325, 741, 772, 907
 Dies Irae (2003) for guitar. 10 October 2003 Wolframs-Eschenbach
 Marsch 1933-1945 (2006) for guitar. 19 May 2006 Shenzhen
 Zithat (2006) for treble zither. 20 October 2007 Hanau
 1000 Töne (2007) for accordion. 23 November 2007 Fürth

Duos 
 Kurioso (1983) for bassoon and accordion. 5 December 1986 Nuremberg
 Sphinx (1988) for percussion and accordion. 19 April 1988 Würzburg
 Trip (1992) for bass drum (2 players), after a text by Günter Eich. 22 June 1992 Würzburg
 Liaison (1992) for flute and accordion. 12 February 1993 in Lohr am Main (with the flutist Carina Vogel and Stefan Hippe)
 Dessins (1994) for piano 4 hands. 5 March 1994, Würzburg
 Nerv (1995) for clarinet in A (B) and accordion. 15 September 1995, Nuremberg
 Zwei Ländler (1996) for clarinet and accordion. 17 November 1996, Erlangen
 Signale (2001) for trumpet and organ. 10 November 2001, Munich
 Der Kampf des Enkidu (2002) for 2 percussionists. 21 June 2002, Oberasbach
 Stephanus-Monologe (2002) for clarinet in B and organ. 19 May 2002 Nuremberg (Lorenzkirche; for the inauguration of the Stephanusorgel).
 Pression (2008) for violin and accordion. 2 March 2008, Nuremberg
 Acht Kafka-Skizzen (2008) for piano and accordion. 14 October 2008, Prague

Trios 
 Souvenir d’une vie (1984) for flute, violin and accordion. 23 November 1984, Nuremberg.
 Naive Stücke (2002) for 3 trombones. 22 February 2003 Nuremberg
 ZwôSibenAhteVier (2007) for 3 organs. 18 October 2007 Nuremberg (Lorenzkirche); for the inauguration of the Laurentiusorgel)

Quartets 
 Die drei Teiche von Hellbrunn (1989). 1st string quartet, with soprano solo and double bass: see under Vocal Compositions.
 2nd String Quartet (1993). 31 July 1994 Hitzacker (Minguet Quartet)
 Wild with love (1997). Chamber music no. (1st movement) for voice, flute, percussion and accordion: see under Vocal compositions.
 Les quatre Anges et les Vents de la Terre (1997) for accordion quartet (3 accordions and basso). 29 April 1998, Nuremberg
 Offertorium (2003) for bassoon quartet (3 bassoons and contrabassoon). 31 July 2005 Langenzenn
 Die Angst des Torhüters (2006) for oboe, clarinet, violin and violoncello. 26 January 2006 Stuttgart
 Drei Bilder (2007) for 2 clarinets, alto saxophone and bass clarinet. 26 January 2008, Dithmarschen (Music School)

Quintets 
 Die Versuchung des heiligen Antonius (1986) for 5 accordions. 28 April 1987 Nuremberg. - (1997 version for accordion orchestra).
 Reise nach (1988) for 5 accordions. 23 April 1988 Erlangen
Version for 4 accordions and basso (1997). 10 May 1997 Passau
 Catch (2001) for accordion quintet (4 accordions with M3 and basso). 3 February 2002 Wunsiedel

Sextets 
 Der Schatz des heiligen Laurentius (2008) for brass quintet and organ. 15 July 2008 Nürnberg (Lorenzkirche)

Septets 
 Terpsichore (1986) for 7 percussionists. 14 October 1986 Nürnberg

Octets 
 Annacamento (1996). Kammermusik No.2 für Ensemble (1[Picc].0.1.0 – 0.0.0.0 – Schlagzeug – Klavier – Akkordeon – Streicher: 1.0.1.1.0). Premiere 9 November 1996 Nürnberg (Ensemble Ars Nova, conductor: Werner Heider) 
 Faux! (2002) for accordion ensemble (6 accordions with M3 and 2 basso). 19 October 2002, Malden (Netherlands)

References

External links 
 
 
 
 Stefan Hippe im AUGEMUS Musikverlag Ralf Kaupenjohann

20th-century classical composers
German composers
German opera composers
20th-century hymnwriters
Male film score composers
German film score composers
Classical accordionists
Academic staff of the University of Erlangen-Nuremberg
1966 births
Living people
Musicians from Nuremberg
20th-century German male musicians